The James Jones Literary Society is an association that honors American author James Jones by sponsoring a number of literature awards.

History 
The Society was founded in 1991 at Lincoln Trail College, Robinson, Illinois. As of 2008, it had nearly 300 members from 34 states and 5 countries. The Society sponsors a national symposium every year, when the First Novel Fellowship is awarded; these are held in different locations, but return every third year to Robinson, Jones's home town.

First Novel Fellowship 
The Society's best known award is the Annual James Jones First Novel Fellowship, co-sponsored by Wilkes University. It was established in 1992, and as of 2011 is a $10,000 prize, and two $750 runner up awards, awarded to American authors of first novels in progress that honor "the spirit of unblinking honesty, determination, and insight into modern culture" that Jones's works exemplified. 667 entries were received for the 2011 contest.

Laine Cunningham, winner of the 2003 award for her novel Message Stick, credits the award for US and international agents beginning to call her. She has since sponsored her own writing award.

Awards

Other awards 

Since 2006, the Society has co-sponsored the annual Illinois Emerging Writers Competition, created in 2005 by Secretary of State of Illinois and State Librarian Jesse White. Originally this consisted solely of the Gwendolyn Brooks Poetry Award, but since the co-sponsorship of the Society, it has also included the James Jones Short Story Award. Each category carries prizes of $500, $300, and $100 for unpublished works. Both are named after Illinois writers.

Since 2007, the Society has been working to establish the James Jones Chair in World War II Studies at Eastern Illinois University.

The Society sponsors an annual Valentine Essay Contest, based on Jones's short story, "The Valentine", for high school seniors from Crawford County, Illinois and Clark County, Illinois. The $75 and $50 prizes are awarded on Valentine's Day.

References

External links 
 James Jones Literary Society Official site

American literary awards
Literary societies
Organizations established in 1991
1991 establishments in Illinois
Awards established in 1992
1992 establishments in Illinois